A. Vernon  "Sheepy" Randall was an American football coach.  He was the ninth head football coach at Wabash College in Crawfordsville, Indiana, serving for one season, in 1894, and compiling a record of 4–5.

Head coaching record

References

Year of birth missing
Year of death missing
Wabash Little Giants football coaches
Wabash College alumni